Titusville Historic District may refer to:

Titusville Historic District (Titusville, Florida)
Titusville Historic District (Titusville, New Jersey), listed on the National Register of Historic Places in Mercer County, New Jersey
Titusville Historic District (Titusville, Pennsylvania), listed on the National Register of Historic Places in Crawford County, Pennsylvania